Your Day Will Come  (Lak Yawm Ya Zalem) is a classic 1951 Egyptian crime thriller film directed by Salah Abouseif. It starred Faten Hamama, Mahmoud el-Meliguy, Mohammed Tawfik and Mohsen Sarhan and was chosen as one of the best 150 Egyptian film productions in 1996, during the Egyptian Cinema centennial. The film was presented in the Berlin International Film Festival.

Plot 
A greedy man betrays his friend and falls in love with his wife, who is a rich lady. He kills him and marries the widow. He steals her money and jewelry and mistreats her. He is then arrested by the police and receives his punishment.

Cast
 Mohammad Tawfik
 Faten Hamama
 Mahmoud Al Meleji
 Muhsen Sarhan

External links 
 
 Film summary

1951 films
1950s Arabic-language films
1951 crime drama films
Films directed by Salah Abu Seif
Egyptian crime drama films
Egyptian black-and-white films